Apstar 2R, also known as Telstar 10 and SinoSat 1C located at 76.5°E, is a communications satellite equipped with 27 C band and 24 Ku band transponders (36 MHz equivalents). The C band payload provides coverage of Asia, Australia, parts of Europe and Africa. The Ku band payload covers Korea and China, including Hong Kong, Macau and Taiwan. Telstar 10, which hosts one of the most extensive cable neighborhoods in Asia, distributes cable television programming, direct-to-home services, telecommunications, as well as Internet and VSAT (very small aperture terminal) services.

See also
 Apstar 2

References

External links
List of Active Channel on Telstar 10
 

Communications satellites in geostationary orbit
Satellites using the SSL 1300 bus
Communications satellites of China
1997 in China